The 2019–20 season was Queen of the South's seventh consecutive season back in the second tier of Scottish football and their seventh season in the Scottish Championship, having been promoted as champions from the Scottish Second Division at the end of the 2012–13 season. Queens also competed in the Scottish Cup, the League Cup, and the Challenge Cup.

Summary
Queens finished ninth in the Scottish Championship, although there were no play-offs due to the COVID-19 pandemic. Queens retained their place in the Championship after the leagues were ended by utilising a points-per-game ratio to determine the final league standings.

Queens reached the third round of the Challenge Cup, losing 3–2 away to Clyde.

The Doonhamers were knocked out after the first round of the League Cup after the completion of fixtures in Group E that included Annan Athletic, Dumbarton, Greenock Morton and Motherwell.

Queens reached the third round of the Scottish Cup, losing 2–1 to Queen's Park at Palmerston.

On 13 March 2020, all SPFL leagues were indefinitely suspended due to the COVID-19 pandemic.

On 8 April 2020, the SPFL proposed to end the 2019–20 season by utilising a points-per-game ratio to determine the final league standings.

On 15 April 2020, the plan was approved, with this declaration that the season was concluded, as Dundee United were declared title winners, with Partick Thistle relegated to League One.

Results & fixtures

Pre season

Scottish Championship

Scottish League Cup

Scottish Challenge Cup

Scottish Cup

Player statistics

Captains

|-

|-

Squad 

|}

Disciplinary record

Top scorers
Last updated 10 March 2020

Clean sheets
{| class="wikitable" style="font-size: 95%; text-align: center;"
|-
!width=15|
!width=15|
!width=15|
!width=150|Name
!width=80|Scottish Championship
!width=80|Challenge Cup
!width=80|League Cup
!width=80|Scottish Cup
!width=80|Total
|-
|*1
|GK
|
|Robby McCrorie
|5
|0
|0
|0
|5
|-
|1
|GK
|
|Ross Stewart
|1
|0
|0
|0
|1
|-
|20
|GK
|
|Jack Leighfield
|0
|0
|0
|0
|0
|-
|
|
|
! Totals !! 6 !! 0 !! 0 !! 0 !! 6

Team statistics

League table

League Cup table

Division summary

Management statistics
Last updated 10 March 2020

Transfers

Players in

Players out

See also
List of Queen of the South F.C. seasons

Notes

References

Queen of the South F.C. seasons
Queen of the South